Alexander Blair III (April 22, 1867–November 16, 1931) was an American architect. He designed the Grand Opera House (1884) in Macon, Georgia, eight Georgia county courthouses, and other buildings. His father was also an architect and his son Algernon Blair (1873-1952) was a prominent builder.

By 1880 his family was living in Macon, Georgia.

Works
Decatur County Courthouse, Bainbridge, Georgia - the first courthouse he designed
The Academy, now the Grand Opera House, Macon, Georgia, 621 Mulberry Street
Telfair County Courthouse, McRae, Georgia (1906)
Cairo, Georgia Depot (Atlantic Coast Line Railroad) (1905)
Murray County Courthouse, Chatsworth, Georgia (1916)
Turner County Courthouse, Ashburn, Georgia (1908) with Peter E. Dennis
Wilkinson County Courthouse, Irwinton, Georgia (1924) 
Montgomery County Courthouse, Mount Vernon, Georgia (1907)
Alexander Blair residence, Macon, Georgia
Nicholas M. Block house, Macon, Georgia, on College Street
 Dr. Thomas N. Baker House, Macon, Georgia (1908) on Vineville Avenue

References

1867 births
1931 deaths
Architects from Georgia (U.S. state)
People from Macon, Georgia